Baotang Wuzhu (714–774CE), was the head and founder of Baotang Monastery in Chengdu, Sichuan, south west China. Both (Kim Ho-shang) and Baotang Wuzhu were of the same school of Chinese Chán, the East Mountain Teaching (incorrectly known in Western scholarship by the pejorative nomenclature "Northern School").

Born in what is now Shaanxi Province, his father had served in the army during the early years of the reign of Emperor Xuanzong of Tang. Wuzhu, also known for his strength and martial abilities, served in a yamen as Patrolling Grand Lance Officer before beginning his study of Buddhism under the enlightened layman Chen Chuzang.

See also
 Trisong Detsen (755–797 or 804 CE)
 Shenxiu (c.606–706)

Notes

Further reading
 Adamek, Wendi L. (2011). The Teachings of Master Wuzhu: Zen and Religion of No-Religion. New York: Columbia University Press.  (pbk.)
 Matsumoto, Shiro (松本史郞) (undated). Critical Considerations on Zen Thought. Komazawa University. Source:  (accessed: January 25, 2008)
 Poceski, Mario (undated). Attitudes Towards Canonicity and Religious Authority in Tang Chan. University of Florida. Source:  (accessed: January 25, 2008)
 Poceski, Mario (2007). Patterns of Engagement with Chan Teachings Among the Mid-Tang Literati. Association of Asian Studies Annual Meeting, Boston 2007. “Intersections of Buddhist Practice, Art, and Culture in Tang China” Panel. University of Florida. Source:  (accessed: January 25, 2008)

Buddhism in China
Chinese philosophy
Chinese Buddhist monks
Chan Buddhists
8th-century Buddhist monks